This is a list of film chronicles produced in Albania.

Film chronicles by decade
 Film chronicles of the 1940s
 Film chronicles of the 1950s

See also
 Albanian National Center of Cinematography
 Albanian Central Film Archive
 Cinema of Kosovo

External links
 Albanian Film Database

Film chronicles